Itzik Feffer (10 September 1900 – 12 August 1952), also Fefer (Yiddish איציק פֿעפֿער, Russian Ицик Фефер, Исаàк Соломòнович Фèфер) was a Soviet Yiddish poet executed on the Night of the Murdered Poets during Joseph Stalin's purges.

Early life
Itzik Feffer was born in Shpola, a town in the Zvenigorod uyezd (district) of Kiev Governorate, in what was then part of the Russian Empire and is now part of today's Cherkasy Oblast in Ukraine. His father was a teacher of Hebrew, as well as a poet, and served as his son's teacher. He was killed by the Nazis during the occupation of Ukraine in the Second World War. 

Feffer started working at a young age as a printer. In 1917 he joined the Bund and volunteered for the Red Army and fought in Ukraine. Captured by Anton Denikin's counterintelligence, he ended up in a Kyiv prison, from where he was released by armed workers.

Soviet career
In 1919 he joined the Communist Party and was a member of it until his death. He edited literary and art magazines in Yiddish and took an active part in the life of writers' organizations in Ukraine and Moscow. He was a member of the Presidium of the Supreme Soviet of the Ukrainian SSR and a member of the board of the Supreme Soviet of the USSR.

Feffer had also allegedly been one of the "most loyal and conformist Yiddish poets", who had helped to enforce strict ideological control over other Yiddish writers, and had a history of denouncing colleagues for their "nationalistic hysteria".

Literary work
Feffer was a prolific poet who wrote almost exclusively in Yiddish. He made his debut in 1919 in the Kyiv newspaper "Komunistishe fon" ("Communist Banner") and was later published in the newspapers "Yugnt", "Nye Zeit", "Folks-Zeitung", "Shtern", "Ukraine", and "Proletarishe fon". He became one of the leaders of the Kiev literary group "Vidervuks" ("Growth"). His published works in Yiddish take up almost eighty volumes. 

He was the most politicized among Jewish poets, devoting most of his poems to the construction of socialism. In his early poems Feffer praised the revolution and the party. His poems were quickly published and he earned himself a senior position among Jewish Soviet writers. He wrote propaganda songs as well as lyrical folk songs, songs of nature, and songs of praise for the Jewish community in Birobidzhan. He was also engaged in the study of literature, criticism and linguistic innovation, and was also a prolific children's poet. His play The Sun Doesn't Set was staged by the Moscow State Jewish Theatre in 1947.

With the outbreak of World War II, the Nazi invasion of the Soviet Union, and the beginning of the mass extermination of the Jews, Feffer completely changed the essence of his poetry. He wrote national Jewish songs and lamented the destruction of Eastern European Jewry. His epic poem  ("The Shadows of the Warsaw Ghetto") is a tribute to the 750 Jews who rebelled against the Nazi liquidation of the ghetto and gave their lives fighting tyranny during World War II.

His poems were widely translated into Russian and Ukrainian. He is considered one of the greatest Soviet poets in the Yiddish language and his poems were widely admired inside and outside Russia.

Some of his poems were translated into Hebrew and published in the literary press and in anthologies by translators such as Avraham Shlunsky, Samson Meltzer, Moshe Basuk, Uriel Ofek and others. No volume of his own has been translated into Hebrew in its entirety.

Activities during World War II
After the Second World War broke out, he was evacuated to Ufa. Feffer enlisted in the Red Army for the second time, serving as a military reporter with the rank of colonel. He was also vice chairman of the Soviet Jewish Anti-Fascist Committee and, with Solomon Mikhoels, toured the United States, Mexico, Canada and the United Kingdom in 1943 to win popular support and raise money for the Soviet Union, broadcasting the message that anti-Semitism no longer existed in the Soviet Union. 

In April 1942, he became deputy editor of the newspaper Eynikayt («Эйникайт» or "Unity") published by the JAC. In February 1944, together with Mikhoels and Shakne Epshtein, he signed a letter to Joseph Stalin with a request to organize an autonomous Jewish region in the Crimea.

Feffer closely collaborated with the NKVD and held secret meetings with Lavrentiy Beria to report on the activities and attitudes of the JAC's members; during the war, he was supervised by the deputy head of the counterintelligence department of the NKVD, Leonid Raikhman. Mikhoels and other members of the JAC guessed (or knew) about Feffer's connections with the NKVD, but did not hide anything from him, believing that they did not face any jeopardy, since all the activities of the committee were for the benefit of the state.

Arrest and death
In 1948, after the assassination of Mikhoels, Feffer, along with other JAC members, was arrested and accused of treason. Since Feffer had been an informer for the NKVD he reportedly hoped he would be treated differently and cooperated with the investigation, not only providing false information that would lead to the arrest and indictment of over a hundred people, but implicating himself. 

Efforts were made abroad to save him. The American concert singer and actor Paul Robeson had met Feffer on 8 July 1943, in New York during a Jewish Anti-Fascist Committee event chaired by Albert Einstein, one of the largest pro-Soviet rallies ever held in the United States. After the rally, Paul Robeson and his wife Eslanda Robeson befriended Feffer and Mikhoels.

Six years later, in June 1949, during the 150th-anniversary celebration of the birth of Alexander Pushkin, Robeson visited the Soviet Union to sing in concert. According to David Horowitz

During his concert in Tchaikovsky Hall on 14 June - which was broadcast across the entire country - Robeson publicly paid tribute to Feffer and the late Mikhoels, singing the Vilna Partisan song "Zog Nit Keynmol" in both Russian and Yiddish. The song was met with a standing ovation from the hall.

Returning to the US, Robeson organized a letter in defense of Feffer, which was signed by writer Howard Fast and the then-chairman of the World Peace Council, French physicist Frédéric Joliot-Curie, among others. According to observers, Robson's letter delayed Feffer's death by three years.

In 1952, however, Feffer, along with other defendants, was tried at a closed trial of JAC members, ostensibly due to their support of the American-backed proposal to establish an autonomous region for Jews in the Crimea. Feffer realized during this trial, when the defendants pleaded not guilty and spoke about the methods by which the investigation was conducted, that he would not be spared, and retracted his testimony: 
Investigator Likhachev told me: "If we arrest you, then we will find the crime ... We will knock out everything we need from you." So it turned out. I am not a criminal, but being very intimidated, I gave fictitious testimony against myself and others.
Feffer also expressed pride in his Jewish identity. 

The tribunal convicted him of giving "slanderous information about the situation of Jews in the USSR" to an American contact, as noted in a letter from Minister of State Security Semyon Ignatyev to the Secretary of the Central Committee of the CPSU Georgy Malenkov dated February 7, 1953. Feffer was executed on 12 August 1952 at the Lubyanka Building.

Feffer was rehabilitated posthumously in 1955, after Stalin's death; a cenotaph for him was installed at the Moscow Nikolo-Arkhangelsk cemetery. His poems have been reprinted, both in Yiddish and in Russian translation.

Family
His wife Rakhil Gershkovna Kalish (1900-1982) was arrested on the night of January 13-14, 1949. His daughter Dora Isaakovna Fefer-Kalish (1924-2007) was arrested in 1952. Her husband Evel Moiseevich Klimovsky (1923-1992) was also repressed. His sister Daria (Dasha) Feffer was arrested at the same time as his wife.

Books of poetry
 (Splinters), 1922;
 (About Me and Others Like Me), 1924;
 (A Stone to a Stone), 1925;
 (Simple Words), 1925;
 (Blossoming Garbage), 1926, a paradoxical title about the revival of a shtetl in Soviet times;
 (Found Sparkles), 1928;
 (Competition), 1930;
 (Posters in Bronze), 1932;
 (Force), 1937;
 1943;
 (Anew), 1948.

References

Further reading

 Rappaport, Louis. Stalin's War Against the Jews: The Doctors Plot & The Soviet Solution (Free Press: 1990) 
 Stewart, Jeffrey C. (editor). Paul Robeson: Artist and Citizen. Hardcover (Rutgers Univ Pr, April 1, 1998) , Paperback (Rutgers Univ Pr, April 1, 1998)  
 Duberman, Martin. Paul Robeson: A Biography, (New Press; Reissue edition (May 1, 1995). .

External links
 Itzik Fefer books and audio recordings in the Yiddish Book Center digital library (in Yiddish)
https://web.archive.org/web/20060523070618/http://www.midstreamthf.com/200207/feature.html
  http://lib.ru/PROZA/LEWASHOW/mihoels.txt  A novel in Russian detailing Mihoels and Feffer's trip to the U.S. and other countries during World War II and Mihoels' subsequent murder.

1900 births
1952 deaths
People from Shpola
Ukrainian Jews
Communist Party of the Soviet Union members
Yiddish-language poets
Soviet poets
Russian male poets
Soviet male writers
20th-century male writers
Executed writers
Antisemitism in Russia
Jews executed by the Soviet Union
Executed Soviet people from Ukraine
Soviet show trials
Soviet rehabilitations
Jewish anti-fascists
Ukrainian anti-fascists